"No Second Prize" is the debut single by Scottish-born Australian rock musician Jimmy Barnes, released in August 1984 as the lead single from his debut studio album, Bodyswerve. It peaked at number 12 on the Australian Kent Music Report. The song was originally demoed by Cold Chisel but never recorded by them. It was written in 1980 as a tribute to Chisel roadies Alan Dallow and Billy Rowe, who died in a truck crash.

At the 1984 Countdown Music Awards, Barnes won Best Male Performance in a Video.

Track listing
7" Single (K 9468)
Side A "No Second Prize" - 4:20
Side B "I've Got News for You" - 3:04

12" /Maxi (X14109)
Side A "No Second Prize" (Extended) - 5:55
Side B1 "Piece of My Heart" - 4:07
Side B2 "No Second Prize" - 4:21

Charts

References

1980 songs
1984 debut singles
Jimmy Barnes songs
Songs written by Jimmy Barnes
Song recordings produced by Mark Opitz
Mushroom Records singles